Rahinnane Castle is a tower house and National Monument located in County Kerry, Ireland.

Location

History

The ringfort on the site was built in the 7th or 8th century AD. The Irish name was originally Rath Fhionnáin — Finan's ringfort.

Local tradition once claimed that this piece of land was the last in Ireland held by the Vikings, as it was so easily defended.

The stone tower house was built in the 15th or 16th century by the FitzGeralds, hereditary Knights of Kerry.

In 1602, towards the end of the Nine Years' War, the castle was taken by Sir Charles Wilmot. It was ruined during the Cromwellian conquest (1649–53).

Building

The castle was rectangular and three storeys tall. Most of the outer walls remain; on the inside there is some mural stairway, traces of vaulting and a blind arcade. Two corner turrets are also visible.

More than half the outer walls of the three-storey castle remain.

References

National Monuments in County Kerry
Castles in County Kerry